The women's javelin throw event at the 2002 Commonwealth Games was held on 29 July.

This was the first time that the new model of javelin was used in the women's competition at the Commonwealth Games.

Results

References
Official results
Results at BBC

Javelin
2002
2002 in women's athletics